The Woman in Black: Angel of Death is a 2014 supernatural horror film directed by Tom Harper and starring Phoebe Fox, Jeremy Irvine, Helen McCrory, Adrian Rawlins, Leanne Best, and Ned Dennehy. The screenplay was written by Jon Croker from a story by Susan Hill. It is the sequel to the 2012 film The Woman in Black, and is produced by Hammer Film Productions and Entertainment One. During WWII, the London bombings force two schoolteachers to evacuate a group of children to Crythin Gifford. When the refugees take shelter at Eel Marsh House, one teacher, Eve Parkins, soon realizes they are not alone. Little does she know that what lives in the house is more sinister than what they were running from. It had a premiere in Dubai on December 30, 2014.

Plot
Thirty years after the events of the first film, during the London Blitz, Eve Parkins joins some of her schoolchildren and the school's headmistress, Jean Hogg, to evacuate them to the isolated market town of Crythin Gifford. On the train journey there, Eve meets dashing RAF pilot Harry Burnstow, who is stationed at an airfield near Crythin Gifford. Upon arrival at the apparently nearly deserted town, Eve is confronted by a raving madman, Jacob, and flees.

Although Eve and Jean do not approve of Eel Marsh House, the isolated manor house on an island in the marshes where they have been billeted, there is no alternative. That night, Eve has a nightmare of how she was forced to give up her baby when she was younger; when she awakens, she hears the noise of a rocking chair coming from the cellar. There she finds a message, scolding her for letting her child go, and sees a woman dressed in black. The next morning, one of the children, Edward, who has been mute since the death of his parents in the bombing, is bullied by two other children and sees the Woman in Black in the nursery. Eve feels that something is wrong when Edward starts constantly carrying around a rotting doll. That night, one of the boys who was bullying him is drawn out of the house by the Woman in Black; Eve finds his body on the beach, mangled by barbed wire.

Eve later sees the Woman in the graveyard, where she finds the grave of Nathaniel Drablow. She chases the ghost to the beach and is overcome by visions of Nathaniel's death. At the house, she and Harry establish the story of the ghost through an old recording made by Alice Drablow before her death at the hands of the Woman in Black: it is her sister, Jennet Humfrye, the mother of the child she adopted, Nathaniel. Jennet is haunting them because of Nathaniel's premature death, and is punishing Eve in particular for giving up her baby. Eve journeys into the abandoned town to confront Jacob, who is blind and therefore unable to be killed by the ghost, as he cannot see her. However, he has been driven insane by the deaths of all the other children (whose ghosts surround him) and tries to kill Eve before she escapes.

Back at the house, Jean finds one of the girls trying to strangle herself under the Woman's spell. During an air raid, the girl suffocates herself using a gas mask. After this death, Harry takes them to his airfield, which is revealed to be a decoy. Harry, the only man stationed there, has been disgraced following a crash in which he was the only survivor, and is no longer allowed to fly. Eve realises that the Woman has followed them. Edward flees and apparently dies by walking into a fire basket. Eve, however, realises that Edward is still alive and at Eel Marsh House. Realising that the Woman in Black wants her alone, she drives to the island, where she finds Edward walking out into the marsh to drown himself where Nathaniel died. She crawls after him, but they are dragged down into the mud by the ghost. At the last minute, Harry arrives and saves them, though he is dragged down to his death instead.

Months later, Eve has adopted Edward, and they are living in London. Although they believe they are free from the ghost, once they leave their house, she appears again and smashes a picture of Harry and his crew.

Cast

Development
In April 2012, Hammer Films announced that there would be a sequel to The Woman in Black, titled The Woman in Black: Angel of Death. Originally, the official plot synopsis was different from that of the final film: "Seized by the government and converted into a military mental hospital during World War II, the sudden arrival of disturbed soldiers to Eel Marsh House has awoken its darkest inhabitant. Eve, a beautiful young nurse, is sent to the house to care for the patients but soon realises she must save them from more than their own demons. Despite Eve’s efforts to stop her, one by one they fall victim to the Woman in Black."

The screenplay was written by Jon Croker though the original novel's author, Susan Hill, was approached to help with the story. In October 2012, Tom Harper was announced as the film's director. In April 2013, it was announced that Jeremy Irvine will play the lead role. Rumours circulated that Daniel Radcliffe would briefly reprise his role from the first film but this never came to pass. Principal photography for the film began in early 2014.

Film novelisation
On 18 October 2013, a novelisation of the film's screenplay was released by Hammer Books (Random House Publishing) in England. The novelisation was written by crime fiction author Martyn Waites, and critical reception for the book has been generally negative.

Soundtrack
The soundtrack album was released on 30 December 2014 over the Indie label Varèse Sarabande Records.

Release

Theatrical release
The movie was originally set to be released on 30 January 2015, but instead it was moved to 1 January 2015. It was released in Canada and the United States on 2 January 2015, then released in France on 14 January 2015 and in Russia on 15 January 2015.

Home media
The Woman in Black: Angel of Death was released on DVD and Blu-ray on 14 April 2015. The Blu-ray features the documentary "Pulling Back the Veil: The Woman in Black 2 - Angel of Death"

Critical response
On Rotten Tomatoes, the film holds a rating of 23%, based on 81 reviews, with an average rating of 4.5/10. The consensus reads, "The Woman in Black 2: Angel of Death is atmospheric and visually sharp, but it's short on tension and scares." Metacritic, which uses a weighted average, assigned a score of 42 out of 100, based on 23 critics, indicating "mixed or average reviews". Audiences polled by CinemaScore gave the film a grade of "C" on an A+ to F scale.

Olly Richards of Empire (film magazine) gave it 3 out of 5 and called it "A much bolder, braver horror sequel than most. Except for a wispy ending, it’s a match for the first."

References

External links
 
 
 The Woman In Black: Angel of Death at Hammer Film Productions
  22-10-2014

2010s historical films
2014 horror films
Alliance Films films
British ghost films
American supernatural horror films
British historical horror films
British sequel films
British supernatural horror films
Canadian sequel films
Canadian supernatural horror films
English-language Canadian films
Exclusive Media films
Films about educators
Films directed by Tom Harper
Films scored by Marco Beltrami
Films set in 1941
Films set in country houses
Films set in Yorkshire
Hammer Film Productions horror films
Relativity Media films
2010s English-language films
2010s Canadian films
2010s American films
2010s British films